Palm Avenue station is a station on the Blue Line of the San Diego Trolley located in the Palm City neighborhood of San Diego. The stop serves a variety of purposes, holding the function of commuter center with a park and ride lot and providing access to the nearby commercial and residential areas.

History

This station was originally scheduled to undergo renovation starting September 2014, as part of the Trolley Renewal Project, though actual renovation construction didn't begin until October 2014; it reopened with a renovated station platform in March 2015.

Station layout
There are two tracks, each with a side platform.

See also
 List of San Diego Trolley stations

References

Blue Line (San Diego Trolley)
Railway stations in the United States opened in 1981
San Diego Trolley stations in San Diego
1981 establishments in California